Michal Roman (born December 15, 1997) is a Slovak professional ice hockey player. He is currently playing for HC Nové Zámky of the Slovak Extraliga.

Roman made his Czech Extraliga debut playing with HC Oceláři Třinec during the 2015-16 Czech Extraliga season.

Career statistics

Regular season and playoffs

International

References

External links

1997 births
Living people
HC Oceláři Třinec players
Slovak ice hockey defencemen
MsHK Žilina players
HKM Zvolen players
MHk 32 Liptovský Mikuláš players
HC '05 Banská Bystrica players
HC Nové Zámky players
Slovak expatriate ice hockey players in the Czech Republic